The Northern Bloc of the United Self-Defense Forces of Colombia was a Colombian paramilitary organization that operated until March 2006, when it demobilized.

Blocs of the United Self-Defense Forces of Colombia
Military units and formations disestablished in 2006
2006 disestablishments in South America